The Lua Curtiss House I (also known as The Alamo) is a historic home in Miami Springs, Florida. It is located at 85 Deer Run. On November 1, 1985, it was added to the U.S. National Register of Historic Places.  It was a work of Curtiss & Bright.

References

External links

 Dade County listings at National Register of Historic Places
 Dade County listings at Florida's Office of Cultural and Historical Programs

Houses in Miami-Dade County, Florida
National Register of Historic Places in Miami-Dade County, Florida
Pueblo Revival architecture in Miami Springs, Florida